Ghost Ship is the twelfth book in the NUMA Files series, created by American author Clive Cussler. It was published in May 2014. The novel sees the NUMA team struggling to piece together the causation of a yacht disaster, which leads them into a shadowy conspiracy of state-backed cybercrime.

2014 American novels
The NUMA Files
G. P. Putnam's Sons books
Collaborative novels